Lethem may refer to:

Places 
 Lethem, Guyana, town in Guyana
 Lethem Airport

Other uses 
 Lethem (surname)

See also 
 Letham (disambiguation)